The 1968 Rhode Island gubernatorial election was held on November 5, 1968. Democratic nominee Frank Licht defeated incumbent Republican John Chafee with 51.02% of the vote.

General election

Candidates
Frank Licht, Democratic
John Chafee, Republican

Results

References

1968
Rhode Island
Gubernatorial
November 1968 events in the United States